Keezhvelur Kediliappar Temple (கீழ்வேளூர் கேடிலியப்பர் கோயில்) is a Hindu temple located at Keezhvelur  in Nagapattinam district, Tamil Nadu, India. The historical name of the place is Thirukeezhvelur.
The temple is dedicated to Shiva, as the moolavar presiding deity, in his manifestation as Kediliappar. His consort, Parvati, is known as Vanamulai Amman.

Significance 
It is one of the shrines of the 275 Paadal Petra Sthalams - Shiva Sthalams glorified in the early medieval Tevaram poems by Tamil Saivite Nayanars Tirugnanasambandar and Tirunavukkarasar.

This temple is believed to be 1000 years or more older, based on the sculptures found in temple and notes from old Hindu literatures.

References

External links 
 Official site

Photogallery

Shiva temples in Tiruvarur district
Padal Petra Stalam